The High Commission of Malta in New Delhi, India is located at N60, Panchsheel Park.  The current High Commissioner of Malta in New Delhi, India is  H.E. Mr Reuben Gauci. He arrived in September 2020 and presented credentials on 14 October 2020. 

H.E. Reuben Gauci is also the High Commissioner of Malta to the Maldives, Sri Lanka and Bangladesh, as well as Ambassador of Malta to Nepal.

The High Commission of Malta in India was opened on 2007 and its offices were officially inaugurated on 7 January 2010 by the Former Deputy Prime Minister and Foreign Minister of Malta, Tonio Borg and the Former Minister of State in the Ministry of External Affairs of India, Preneet Kaur.

The High Commission of Malta has strived throughout the years to enhance bilateral relations between Malta and India. It works on the political, economic and cultural fields in order to promote Malta in India.

List of High Commissioners

Wilfred Kennely : 2007–2010

Theresa Cutajar : 2010–2013

John Aquilina : 2013–2015

Stephen Borg : 2016–August 2020

Reuben Gauci : September 2020–present

See also
 India–Malta relations
 List of diplomatic missions in India
 List of diplomatic missions of Malta

References 

Diplomatic missions in India
Malta
New Delhi
India–Malta relations
India and the Commonwealth of Nations
Malta and the Commonwealth of Nations